Thure may refer to:

Thure (river), a tributary of the Sambre in Belgium 
Thuré, a commune in the Vienne department in the Poitou-Charentes region in western France